Jeannie Ebner (1918–2004) was an Austrian writer.

Works
Some of her works are:
 Sie warten auf Antwort (1954)
 Die Wildnis früher Sommer (1958)
 Der Königstiger (1959)
 Die Götter reden nicht (1961)
 Figuren in Schwarz und Weiß (1964)
 Protokoll aus einem Zwischenreich (1975)
 Erfrorne Rosen (1979)
 Drei Flötentöne(1980)
 Papierschiffchen treiben. Erlebnis einer Kindheit (1987)
 ...und hat sein Geheimnis bewahrt (1991)
 Zauberer und Verzauaberte (1992)
 Der Genauigkeit zuliebe. Tagebücher 1942-1980 (1993)
 Sämtliche Gedichte 1940-1993 (1993)

References

1918 births
2004 deaths
Austrian women writers
German-language writers